Toropovskaya is a rural locality (a village) in Bogorodskoye Rural Settlement, Ust-Kubinsky District, Vologda Oblast, Russia. The population was 10 as of 2002.

Geography 
Toropovskaya is located 52 km northwest of Ustye (the district's administrative centre) by road. Bogorodskoye is the nearest rural locality.

References 

Rural localities in Tarnogsky District